A Katsa is a field intelligence officer of the Mossad, the national intelligence agency of Israel. A katsa collects information and runs agents, similar to a case officer of the CIA.

Operation
There are typically 30–40 katsas at a time, operating around the world, mainly in Europe. 

Mossad Katsas often utilise Sayanim, singular: Sayan, (lit. Helpers, Assistants) for their operations. The concept of Sayanim was started by Meir Amit. They are recruited to provide logistical support for Mossad operations. A car Sayan running a rental agency, for instance, could help Mossad agents rent a car without the usual documentation. Sayanim are often non-Israeli citizens but have full loyalty to the state of Israel and can be a dual national. The usage of Sayanim allows the Mossad to operate with a slim budget yet conduct vast operations worldwide. The support that Sayanim provide is unpaid.

Organization

Katsas are organized under the Mossad Head of Operations, in a division known as Tsomet (intersection) or Melucha (kingdom).  They are further split into three geographic branches:
Israelis Branch: Includes the Middle East, North Africa, Spain, and the 'jumper' katsas who move between operations.
Branch B: Covers Germany, Austria, and Italy.
Branch C: Covers United Kingdom, France, Low Countries, and Scandinavia.

Training

In searching for candidates, the Mossad administers a variety of psychological and aptitude tests, as well as assessing their own current needs.  If selected, a candidate must go through and pass the Mossad training academy, the Midrasha, located near the town of Herzliya. The Mossad academy is the official summer residence of the Israeli Prime Minister. There they are taught the tradecraft of intelligence gathering for approximately three years.  The main priority of training is to teach katsas how to find, recruit, and cultivate agents, including how to clandestinely communicate with them.  They also learn how to avoid being the subject of foreign counter-intelligence, by avoiding car and foot surveillance, by killing, and by preventing foreign agents from creating 'traps' at meetings. Once training is completed, trainees will spend an apprenticeship period working on varying projects before becoming full-fledged katsas.

In culture
The debut thriller of JD Wallace, Silent Cats: Deadly Dance,  writes about the true story relationship of a CIA psychological operations officer and a Mossad Kidon Katsa.

References

Thomas, Gordon. Martin, Dillon. Robert Maxwell, Israel's Superspy: The Life and Murder of a Media Mogul. New York: Carroll & Graf Publishers, 2002.

External links
Mossad About us in Hebrew

Spies by role
Mossad

de:Führungsoffizier